Dragoş Neagu (born 28 February 1967) is a retired Romanian rower. He competed in coxless pairs at the 1988 and 1992 Olympics and won a silver medal in 1988. At the world championships he won three silver and one bronze medals in different events between 1987 and 1994.

References

External links
 
 
 

1967 births
Living people
Romanian male rowers
Sportspeople from Bucharest
Olympic rowers of Romania
Rowers at the 1988 Summer Olympics
Rowers at the 1992 Summer Olympics
Olympic silver medalists for Romania
Olympic medalists in rowing
Medalists at the 1988 Summer Olympics
World Rowing Championships medalists for Romania